John Lim (born December 23, 1935) is a South Korean-born American politician from the state of Oregon. He has served in both houses of the Oregon Legislative Assembly and was the Oregon State Senate Majority Leader in 1995. He has unsuccessfully run for the U.S. Senate and for the Republican nomination for Governor of Oregon.

Early life 
Lim was born in Yeoju, Gyeonggi-do, Korea. As an adolescent, Lim suffered from tuberculosis for five years, from which he nearly died. He was married in 1963 and graduated from Seoul Theological College in 1964 with a Bachelor of Arts in Religion. He emigrated to the United States in 1966, penniless. When he first arrived in America, he had no resources and worked as a janitor. He later had plans to become a Catholic priest. He eventually decided against this, however, as it would have required him to abandon his Protestant heritage. As an adult, Lim started several businesses, including a house painting and gardening business, a vitamin distribution company, and a real estate business with his wife.

He continued his theological studies at Western Evangelical Seminary at George Fox University, where he received his Master of Divinity (M.Div.) in 1970.

Political career 
Lim was elected to the 11th district of the Oregon State Senate in 1992. He served as Majority Leader in 1995 and was re-elected in 1996. In April 1999, while serving as chairman of the Trade & Economic Development committee, Lim famously proposed installing signs at the state lines reading, "You are welcome to visit Oregon, but please don't stay." The signs were intended to discourage visitors from moving to Oregon, to preserve the state's economic and ecologic infrastructure as well as general "quality of life."

Lim was the Republican nominee for the United States Senate in 1998, losing to incumbent Democrat Ron Wyden.

Oregon's term limit law was still in effect at the conclusion of his second Senate term, so he left the Senate following the 1999 Legislative session. Lim was succeeded by fellow Republican John Minnis.

In 2004, Lim was elected State Representative of District 50. He was re-elected to that office in 2006, serving in the 73rd Oregon Legislative Assembly and the 74th Oregon Legislative Assembly.

John Lim lost his bid for re-election to the Oregon House in the 2008 general election. Former police officer Greg Matthews, a Democrat, took over representation of Oregon's 50th District in January 2009.

Lim was a candidate for the Republican nomination for Oregon governor in 2010. He came in third out of nine, behind the primary winner Chris Dudley and second-place finisher Allen Alley.

References

External links 
Main page at State Legislature
1999 High Country News story
Minutes of discussion of SB404

1935 births
21st-century American politicians
American politicians of Korean descent
Asian-American people in Oregon politics
Living people
Republican Party members of the Oregon House of Representatives
Republican Party Oregon state senators
People from Gyeonggi Province
South Korean emigrants to the United States
Janitors
Asian conservatism in the United States